Luca Cavallo (born 19 May 1973) is a retired Italian football midfielder.

References

1973 births
Living people
Italian footballers
Genoa C.F.C. players
A.C. Perugia Calcio players
A.C. Monza players
Ternana Calcio players
A.C.N. Siena 1904 players
Cagliari Calcio players
Delfino Pescara 1936 players
S.P.A.L. players
S.S.D. Pro Sesto players
Taranto F.C. 1927 players
U.S.D. Novese players
U.S.D. Sestri Levante 1919 players
Association football midfielders
Serie A players
Serie B players
Paniliakos F.C. managers
Expatriate football managers in Greece
Italian expatriate sportspeople in Greece
Italian football managers